Nir Hen (lit. Meadow of the 58 (ח"ן is 58 in Gematria)) is a moshav in south-central Israel. Located in Hevel Lakhish between Ashkelon and Kiryat Gat, it falls under the jurisdiction of Lakhish Regional Council.

History
The moshav was founded in 1956. Its name is in memory of the 58 passengers who traveled on El Al Flight 402 that was shot down over the skies of Bulgaria about a year before the community was founded. The community was originally settled by Jewish refugees from North Africa, and later other immigrants and native Israelis joined them.

Notable residents
Avri Ran

References

Moshavim
Populated places established in 1956
Populated places in Southern District (Israel)
1956 establishments in Israel
North African-Jewish culture in Israel